Dushkachan (Dushukachan) is a rural locality (a settlement) in Severo-Baykalsky District, Republic of Buryatia, Russia. The population was 68 as of 2010. There are 3 streets.

Geography 
Dushkachan is located 10 km northeast of Nizhneangarsk (the district's administrative centre) by road. Nizhneangarsk is the nearest rural locality.

References 

Rural localities in Severo-Baykalsky District